The 1915–16 Gold Cup was the 4th edition of the Gold Cup, a cup competition in Irish football.

The tournament was won by Linfield for the first time, defeating Distillery 2–0 in a test match after both teams had finished level on points in the league table.

Group standings

Test match

References

1915–16 in Irish association football